American Association for Ethiopian Jews (AAEJ) was a Jewish-American organization that was active between 1974 and 1993 for the purpose of realizing the Aliyah of Beta Israel to Israel. The organization's contribution to the Aliyah of the Beta Israel was significant.

History
Upon his return from Ethiopia to the U.S in 1969, peace activist Jed Abraham founded the "Friends of the Beta Israel Community" organization, and in 1974 it was merged with "American Pro-Falasha Committee (APFC)", that was headed by Martin Wurmbrand. Together they created the "American Association for Ethiopian Jews". It was headed by Graenum Berger.

When it became clear that most Ethiopian Jews had made Aliyah to Israel, the Executive Council decided in 1993 to end the organization's activities. A year later several of its members founded the "Israel Association for Ethiopian Jews" Voluntary association.  In 1998, Nate Shapiro, William Recant, Susan Pollack, Barbara Gaffin, Brett Goldberg and Gerald Frim founded the "Friends of Ethiopian Jews" organization  Friends of Ethiopian Jews to help the Ethiopian Jewish community in Israel by supporting programs for education, employment, advocacy, community development and civil rights.

Presidents
Graenum Berger (1974-1978)
Howard Lenhoff (1978-1983)
Nate Shapiro (1983-1993)
Other Activists
Henry Rosenberg
Barbara Gaffin
Susan Pollack
LaDena Schnapper
William Recant
Brett Goldberg
Bill Halpern

Further reading
Graenum Berger, Rescue the Ethiopian Jews!: a memoir, 1955-1995, J.W. Bleeker Hampton Pub. Co., 1996, 
Howard M. Lenhoff and Jerry L. Weaver, Black Jews, Jews, and Other Heroes: How Grassroots Activism Led to the Rescue of the Ethiopian Jews, Gefen Publishing House Ltd, 2007,

References

Beta Israel
Ethiopian-American history
Ethiopian-Jewish culture in the United States
Jewish organizations based in the United States
1974 establishments in the United States